Henry Krumb (1875–1958) was an American mining engineer. As a Guggenheim engineer, he was the first to apply scientific methods to sampling bulk-tonnage orebodies at the enormous porphyry copper deposit at Bingham Canyon, Utah.

Krumb further refined his churn drill sampling technique at William Boyce Thompson's Inspiration (Miami, Arizona) mine. He also developed the nearby Magma Mine at Superior, Arizona for Thompson. Thompson then built a winter home and gardens nearby, now open to the public as the Boyce Thompson Arboretum, the oldest public botanical garden in the Western US.

The Henry Krumb School of Mines at Columbia University, which encompassed the Department of Earth and Environmental Engineering along with the program in Materials Science and the Earth Engineering center, is named in his honor in 1964. However, in 1998, Columbia did away with its mining program and the Krumb chair in mining has been vacant for at least two decades, as of 2013.

The lecture series at Society for Mining, Metallurgy, and Exploration is also named in his honor.

Krumb graduated from Columbia School of Mines with a E.M. degree in 1898.

External links
 National Mining Hall of Fame bio

References 

1875 births
1958 deaths
American mining engineers
Columbia School of Mines alumni